Tomaso Totolo (born 26 November 1965) is an Italian professional volleyball coach with Russian citizenship. He currently serves as an assistant coach for Zenit Kazan.

External links
 
 Coach profile at LegaVolley.it 
 Coach profile at Volleybox.net

References

Living people
1965 births
Sportspeople from the Province of Verona
Italian volleyball coaches
Volleyball coaches of international teams
Italian expatriates in Poland
Italian expatriates in the Netherlands
Italian expatriates in Russia
Italian expatriates in Serbia
Italian expatriates in Iran
Jastrzębski Węgiel coaches
AZS Olsztyn coaches